The Watch House is a 1977 fiction book by Robert Westall. The main story is about a teenager called Anne, who is left to spend the summer with her mother's old nanny. While there she explores the watch house, writes a guidebook for the watch house and is haunted by a ghost. It is split up into three parts.

Reprintings
A hardback edition was printed in May 2000. It was the 10th edition available. It is used as an education book by many schools around the world.

1977 British novels
Ghost novels
Macmillan Publishers books

 

It may start off a bit slow but honestly a good read